Juan Pizarro may refer to:
Juan Pizarro (conquistador) (c. 1511–1535), Spanish conquistador
Juan Pizarro Navarrete (1934–2022), Spanish physician and politician
Juan Pizarro (baseball) (1937–2021), Puerto Rican baseball pitcher